The Baeksang Arts Awards, also known as the Paeksang Arts Awards, are awards for excellence in film, television and theatre in South Korea. The awards were first introduced in 1965 by Chang Key-young, the founder of the Hankook Ilbo newspaper, whose pen name was "Baeksang". It was established for the development of Korean popular culture and art and for enhancing the morale of artists. They are regarded as one of the most prestigious entertainment awards in South Korea.

Baeksang Arts Awards are annually presented at a ceremony organised by Ilgan Sports and JTBC Plus, affiliates of JoongAng Ilbo, usually in the second quarter of each year, in Seoul. It is the only comprehensive awards ceremony in the country, recognising excellence in film, television and theatre.

Current awards

Film 
 Grand Prize
  Best Film
  Best Director
  Best New Director
  Best Screenplay
  Best Actor
  Best Actress
  Best Supporting Actor
  Best Supporting Actress
  Best New Actor
  Best New Actress
 Technical Award

Television 
 Grand Prize
  Best Drama
  Best Entertainment Program
  Best Educational Show
  Best Director
  Best Screenplay
  Best Actor
  Best Actress
  Best Supporting Actor
  Best Supporting Actress
  Best New Actor
  Best New Actress
  Best Male Variety Performer
  Best Female Variety Performer
 Technical Award

Theatre 
 Baeksang Play
 Best Short Play
 Best Actor
 Best Actress

Other 
  Most Popular Actor
  Most Popular Actress

Retired awards 
 Best Original Soundtrack: 2014
  Best New Director – Television: 1988 to 2011
 Best New Variety Performer
 Most Popular Variety Performer

Special awards

See also 
 List of Asian television awards

References

Sources

External links 

  
 

 
South Korean film awards
South Korean television awards
South Korean theatre awards
Awards established in 1965
Annual events in South Korea
1965 establishments in South Korea